The 2008 Cross River State gubernatorial election occurred on August 23, 2008. Incumbent PDP Governor Liyel Imoke won re-election in the supplementary election, defeating ANPP candidate, Paul Ukpo, to emerge winner.

Liyel Imoke emerged the PDP candidate at the primary election. His running mate Effiok Cobham.

Electoral system
The Governor of Cross River State is elected using the plurality voting system.

Results
The two main contenders registered with the Independent National Electoral Commission to contest in the re-run election were PDP Governor Liyel Imoke, who won the contest by polling 650,723 votes, and ANPP's Paul Ukpo, who follows closely with 15,734. There was a total of 694,853 votes cast in the election and 13,749 invalid votes.

References 

Cross River State gubernatorial elections
Cross River State gubernatorial election
Cross River State gubernatorial by-election